Matthew James Godden (born 29 July 1991) is an English professional footballer who plays as a striker for  club Coventry City.

Godden began his career playing for Scunthorpe United, where he signed professional terms in 2009. During his time at Scunthorpe, he was loaned out on eight occasions in order to gain experience playing first-team football. He joined Ebbsfleet United of the Conference Premier, one of the clubs he had spent time on loan at, on a permanent basis in May 2014. Godden spent two seasons at Ebbsfleet, before making a return to the Football League when he signed for Stevenage in June 2016. He spent two years at Stevenage before joining Peterborough United in June 2018. After one season at Peterborough, Godden signed for Coventry City in August 2019, helping the club win promotion to the Championship during the 2019–20 season.

Career

Early career
Godden started his career at Scunthorpe United, making the decision to move from Kent at the age of 15 to take up Scunthorpe's offer of a place on the club's apprenticeship programme. He progressed through the various youth levels at Scunthorpe before signing his first professional contract at the end of the 2008–09 season. Godden's youth career at Scunthorpe was hampered by persistent injuries, and he states that the management and youth-team managers at Scunthorpe, in particular Tony Daws, showed a lot of faith in him to offer him the professional contract.

Still waiting for his first-team Scunthorpe debut, Godden was loaned to Brigg Town of the Northern Premier League Division One South on a three-month deal, for the opening months of the 2009–10 campaign. He scored nine goals in 20 games during the loan spell, noting how important gaining experience regarding "the more physical side of football" was in terms of his development. He briefly returned to his parent club before being loaned out once again, this time joining Conference North club Ilkeston Town towards the end of 2009. Godden made five appearances during the loan spell, scoring once, the goal coming courtesy of him capitalising on a quickly taken free-kick to score the opening goal in an eventual 4–2 away defeat to Vauxhall Motors on 9 February 2010. He saw out the remainder of the 2009–10 season playing regularly for Scunthorpe's reserve team, scoring ten goals for them in the latter months of the season. Godden signed a one-year contract extension to remain at Scunthorpe on 7 June 2010.

Ahead of the 2010–11 season, Godden trained regularly with the first-team and played in a number of pre-season friendlies for the Championship club, with manager Nigel Adkins stating he was pleased with Godden's development after scoring two goals in three pre-season fixtures. He made his professional first-team debut on 22 September 2010, coming on as an 81st minute substitute in a 5–2 defeat to Premier League club Manchester United in the League Cup at Glanford Park. Godden made his league debut two months later, on 28 December 2010, appearing as a second-half substitute in a 2–0 away victory at Burnley. He made a further five appearances during January 2011, all of which were from the substitutes' bench, and made seven first-team appearances for Scunthorpe during the campaign. He subsequently signed a new contract extension later that month, to remain at Scunthorpe until the summer of 2013.

Loan spells
Several injuries kept Godden out of action for a number of months and he did not play for Scunthorpe during the first half of the 2011–12 season. In March 2012, having not played any football for over a year, Godden joined Conference North club Gainsborough Trinity on a one-month loan agreement. The move meant he joined up with manager Steve Housham, who had managed Godden during his brief loan spell at Brigg Town two-and-a-half years earlier. Godden made his Gainsborough debut a day after signing, on 10 March 2011, coming on as a 58th minute substitute and scoring two minutes later in a 3–2 victory against Nuneaton Town at The Northolme. Godden made eight appearances during the loan spell, scoring twice, his other goal coming as Gainsborough secured a 2–0 win over Eastwood Town on 24 March 2012. He returned to Scunthorpe upon the expiry of the loan deal on 9 April 2012, and made his first appearance for the club in a year-and-a-half when he came on as a late substitute in Scunthorpe's last game of the season, a 1–1 away draw with Tranmere Rovers on 5 May 2012.

Having not played during the opening weeks of the 2012–13 season, Godden re-joined Gainsborough Trinity on an initial one-month loan on 17 August 2012, with a view to the loan being extended. He made four appearances during the loan, which was curtailed by a calf injury that meant he returned to Scunthorpe earlier than planned. After recovering from the injury, Godden was subsequently loaned out to Conference Premier club Ebbsfleet United on a one-month deal on 8 November 2012. The move represented a return home for Godden, with his family being based in Kent. He made his debut two days after joining, coming on as a second-half substitute and scoring the winning goal as Ebbsfleet fought back from two goals down to secure a 3–2 victory over Hyde United. After the match, Godden stated his desire to play first-team football as being the reason behind his loan move, also hoping that a good run of form would impress the new management team in place at Scunthorpe. Godden scored in his following two league matches for Ebbsfleet at the start of December 2012, in home games against Grimsby Town and Cambridge United respectively. He made five appearances during the month-long loan, scoring three times, and although his loan deal with initially extended by a further month on 6 December 2012, he was recalled by Scunthorpe just a week later. Upon his return to Scunthorpe, he made three substitute appearances, before re-joining Ebbsfleet again in March 2013, on another one-month loan deal. He made five appearances for Ebbsfleet during the loan spell, scoring twice, and returned to Scunthorpe in early April that year. His return to Scunthorpe saw him start his first Football League match in a 3–0 away defeat to Preston North End on 6 April 2013, and this served as the start of a run of five consecutive starts to see out the remainder of the season.

Godden remained at Scunthorpe for the 2013–14 season with the club now competing in League Two and he started the season by playing as a second-half substitute in the club's first three matches of the new campaign. Injury once again curtailed his run in the first-team and a seven-week spell out was to spark another disjointed season for Godden. He was sent on loan to another Conference Premier club in the form of Dartford on 8 October 2013, signing on an initial one-month deal. Godden highlighted the importance of the loan spell with his contract at Scunthorpe expiring at the end of the season. He made a scoring debut on the same day his signing was announced, in a 1–1 draw with Salisbury City. He followed this up with a hat-trick as Dartford secured a 4–3 victory over Hyde on 19 October 2013. The loan deal was extended by a further two months, and Godden went on to make 10 appearances during the loan spell, scoring five times. Following a brief return to the first-team set-up at Scunthorpe with two substitute appearances in December 2013, Godden was loaned out once more on 20 February, signing for Tamworth, also of the Conference Premier, for the remainder of the season. Godden made his debut for Tamworth two days later, scoring a late equaliser in a 1–1 draw with Welling United at The Lamb Ground. He scored five goals in 10 appearances during the loan spell.

Ebbsfleet United
With Godden's contract expiring at the end of the month, there were discussions of the prospect of a new contract at Scunthorpe in May 2014. Scunthorpe were aware of a number of clubs' interest in Godden and therefore offered him a deal that meant they maintained compensation rights as well as a willingness to accept an offer should another club be interested in signing him. He subsequently signed a two-year contract with Conference South club Ebbsfleet United on 30 May 2014, who he had previously been on loan at on two occasions. Godden's season started with injury, which meant he missed the opening game of the season, and he did not score for the first 14 league games of his Ebbsfleet career as he was deployed as a right winger, a position he had never previously played in. This ended when he scored a hat-trick, playing as a striker, in a 3–0 victory against Farnborough at Stonebridge Road in November 2014, in-turn giving Ebbsfleet their first home win in four matches. Godden scored a forty-yard volley at Bromley in March 2015, described as "a contender for goal of the season", which turned out to be the winning goal in a 2–1 win. He ended the season having scored 13 times in 37 appearances in all competitions, as Ebbsfleet finished ten points off the play-off places in eighth place.

The 2015–16 season ultimately turned out to be Godden's breakthrough season as he enjoyed his most prolific campaign to date. Godden started the season by scoring once in his first six matches,  his opening goal of the season came in the 54th-minute, helping Ebbsfleet recover from two goals down to draw 2–2 with Whitehawk on 29 August 2015. Two goals a week later against Maidenhead United served as the catalyst for the best goalscoring form of Godden's career as he proceeded to score 15 goals in 17 games from September to December 2015. This included another hat-trick in a 4–2 home victory over Bishop's Stortford on 21 November 2015. After his prolific scoring to end the year, Godden started the first two months of 2016, eight matches in total, without scoring. After scoring in Ebbsfleet's 2–2 home draw with Havant & Waterlooville on 1 March 2016, Godden went on another run of form where he scored 11 goals in 12 matches to end the campaign. This run included scoring four-goals in a 5–0 victory at Hayes & Yeading on 2 April 2016, as well as a hat-trick as Ebbsfleet in a 4–2 home win against Eastbourne Borough on 30 April 2016. The hat-trick turned out to be Godden's final goals for the club. He scored 30 goals in 45 matches in a season where Ebbsfleet would miss out on promotion back to the National League after losing on penalties to Maidstone United in the National League South play-off final.

Stevenage
Godden's contract at Ebbsfleet expired at the end of the season and he subsequently joined League Two club Stevenage on a free transfer, signing a one-year contract, on 6 June 2016. In doing so he became Darren Sarll's first signing as full-time manager of Stevenage. On joining Stevenage, Godden stated "I dropped down to Ebbsfleet to rejuvenate and get regular football. The main aim was to bounce back and make a name for myself in the Football League and I thank Darren Sarll and Stevenage for this opportunity." He made his Stevenage debut on the opening day of the 2016–17 season, playing the whole match in a 2–1 defeat against Crewe Alexandra at Broadhall Way. Godden scored his first goal for Stevenage in his fifth appearance, scoring the winning goal six minutes into injury-time with a first-time finish in the club's 2–1 victory over local rivals Luton Town on 20 August 2016. He scored eight goals during the first half of the season, averaging a goal every three games, and signed a two-year contract extension on 1 December 2016.

It was to be Godden's run of form after the turn of the year into 2017 that would draw attention to him. His first Football League hat-trick in a 3–1 home victory against Newport County would serve as the start of a run of Godden scoring 12 goals in 11 matches to start the year. This meant that, following his two goals in a 3–0 win over Notts County on 4 March 2017, he had scored more goals than any other player in England's top four tiers in the opening months of that calendar year. Due to this form, Godden was named League Two Player of the Month for February 2017. He ended the season as Stevenage's top goalscorer, scoring 21 goals in 43 matches in all competitions, in a season where Stevenage would miss out on the play-off places as a result of a tenth-place finish. Godden was named Stevenage's Player of the Year at the club's end-of-season award ceremony.

Despite interest from several League One clubs, including Charlton Athletic, Godden remained at Stevenage for the 2017–18 season. He scored his first goal of the campaign in his sixth league appearance of the season, a 2–1 home defeat to Lincoln City on 9 September 2017. He scored 14 times in 44 appearances in all competitions in a season where Stevenage would finish in 16th-place in League Two. Upon the conclusion of the season, Stevenage stated that they had received several enquiries for Godden and that he would "almost certainly leave the club" during the summer.

Peterborough United
After Stevenage stated they were "open to offers" for the player, Godden signed for League One club Peterborough United on 4 June 2018. He joined Peterborough for an undisclosed six-figure fee and on a three-year contract. Upon signing for Peterborough, manager Steve Evans revealed "I am absolutely delighted. Matt is a young man who, without a shadow of a doubt, will score goals for Peterborough United." Godden scored within the first minute of his debut for Peterborough in a 2–1 win over Bristol Rovers on 4 August 2018. A goal-scoring run followed, with Godden scoring eight goals in his first ten games for the club. In the first half of the season, he scored fourteen times, averaging a goal roughly every other game. However, he scored just four times in the second half of the season, leading to him falling out of favour at the club and ultimately to his departure.

Coventry City 
Godden joined League One club Coventry City on a three-year contract on 6 August 2019, for a fee of £750,000 payable over three years. He finished the 2019–20 season as the team's top scorer with 14 goals, helping them to become League One Champions and achieve promotion to The Championship. At the end of the season Godden was named in the PFA League One Team of the Year alongside three other Coventry teammates. He remained at Coventry for the 2020–21 season and began well, scoring 4 goals in his opening 10 games in the Championship, but his season was ultimately disrupted by repeated injuries. Godden scored the winning goal late in injury time on his return to the first team against Reading in September 2021. After winning a penalty against Fulham, which he scored, Godden received a two match suspension for simulation.

Style of play
Godden has spent the majority of his career playing as a striker, although was briefly deployed as a winger at the start of the 2014–15 season when at Ebbsfleet United. He has been described as a "natural finisher".

Career statistics

Honours
Coventry City
League One: 2019–20

Individual
National League South Team of the Year: 2015–16
EFL League Two Player of the Month: February 2017
Stevenage Player of the Year: 2016–17
PFA League One Team of the Year: 2019–20

References

External links

1991 births
Living people
Sportspeople from Canterbury
Footballers from Kent
Association football forwards
English footballers
Scunthorpe United F.C. players
Brigg Town F.C. players
Ilkeston Town F.C. (1945) players
Gainsborough Trinity F.C. players
Ebbsfleet United F.C. players
Dartford F.C. players
Tamworth F.C. players
Stevenage F.C. players
Peterborough United F.C. players
Coventry City F.C. players
English Football League players
National League (English football) players
Northern Premier League players